Farkawn is a village in the Champhai district of Mizoram, India. It is located in the Khawbung R.D. Block.

Fakawn lies about 90 miles south-west of Champhai. There are many Mizo historical monuments in this village, including Fiara Tui, Far Puk, Lamsial Puk, Chhura chi rawt lung, Lungkeiphawtial, Fanai Silai khawhthlakna, Kungawrhi hnuhluhna, Khuavang Lamthuamthum, and Chawngvungi Lung. There also is a Natural Heritage including Lurh Tlang and Tan Tlang, these two are among the five highest Mountains in Mizoram. In Mizo History, Lurh mountain has the authority to our weather and Tan mountain is the living placed for Lasi, popularly known as Chawngtinleri, like a wizard, Lasi can do anything they wish for.

Because of its heritage sites, good weather and scenic beauty, Farkwan is a popular tourist place in Mizoram.

Demographics 

According to the 2011 census of India, Farkawn has 553 households. The effective literacy rate (i.e. the literacy rate of population excluding children aged 6 and below) is 97.64%.

References 

Villages in Khawbung block